Scottish Brazilians refers to Brazilians of full, partial, or predominantly Scottish ancestry, or Scottish-born people residing in Brazil.

Notable Scottish Brazilians

 Archie McLean
 Carlos Drummond de Andrade
 Charles Miller – considered to be the father of football in Brazil, born to Scottish father and Brazilian mother
 Eric Leme Walther Maleson – considered to be the father of Ice Sports in Brazil, 1st Olympic Brazilian Bobsleigh Athlete, Founder and President of the Brazilian Ice Sports Federation (BISF/CBDG). Winner of 3 Bronze Medals at America Bobsleigh Cup (Lake Placid) in 2000, 2001 and 2002.
 Samuel Wallace MacDowell III
 Warwick Estevam Kerr
Scott MacKenzie, darts player

See also

 Brazil–United Kingdom relations
 Immigration to Brazil
 White Brazilians
 Scottish people

References

+
European Brazilian
 
Scottish diaspora by country